The Myth of the Happily Ever After is the ninth studio album by Scottish rock band Biffy Clyro, released on 22 October 2021 through 14th Floor and Warner Records. It is said to be the 'sister album' to their 2020 album A Celebration of Endings. It entered the UK album chart at number 4.

Background 
The band first revealed they were working on a follow-up to A Celebration of Endings in August 2020, with Simon Neil saying the band had "15 songs that didn't make the album" that would make "a sprawling sister record". While in recording, the record had the working titles, "A Commemoration of Commiserations" and the initials "RMV".

The band announced they had finished their "positive but nihilistic" album at the BRIT awards in May 2021, and revealed a potential October release date. Neil said the album was originally "completely hand-in-hand [with A Celebration of Endings]" but "because we didn’t tour I ended up writing about seven or eight new songs for the album. Originally it was intended to be a few off-cuts from ‘A Celebration Of Endings’, but now it’s got wonderful new art and it’s kind of its own beast."

The album was announced on 3 September 2021 alongside the first single "Unknown Male 01", after headlining Reading and Leeds Festival.

Release 
The first single, "Unknown Male 01" was released on 3 September 2021 and conveys "the hopelessness and darkness felt when we lose someone we love". Neil added "when you lose people […] it can make you question every single thing about your own life". 

Released on 20 September, second single "A Hunger in Your Haunt" was written as a "self-motivating mantra", born of "pure frustration".

The 3rd single "Errors in the History of God" premiered on BBC Radio 1 on 21 October, prior to The Myth of the Happily Ever After's release on 22 October 2021. 

A combined music video of the two previously released singles was premiered on YouTube on 28 September 2021.

The band performed the second single off the record "A Hunger in Your Haunt" live on Later... 23 October 2021

Musical style 
The band have said the album is a "reaction" to A Celebration of Endings and lyrically themed as "a fairly positive outlook with […] bone marrow nihilism going down inside of it", and "a rapid emotional response to the turmoil of the past year"

The lead single "Unknown Male 01" has been described as a "slow building track that explores the themes of loss". It starts with "simple yet emotional instrumentation" with "church-like organ" then proceeding to turn into a "riff-laden rock explosion", making use of "hard rock and math rock tendencies". Second single "A Hunger in Your Haunt" was described as a "punching, hard-riffing track", that "jumps between gorgeous melodies and angular yelps, expressing both sides of the band's incredibly diverse sound".  

NME described the whole album as a "record defined by nuance", from "wonky electro and simmering rock of 'Separate Missions'" to the "R&B vibes" and "rock crescendo of 'Haru Urara'". DIY describes the album as having "abundant creative freedom, and Kerrang! describes "song structures [that] are subverted and arrangements are constructed with forensic care, while the level of creativity is unsurpassed".

Track listing

Personnel

Biffy Clyro 
 Simon Neil – lead vocals, guitars, keyboards (all tracks); violin (1, 11)
 James Johnston – bass guitar (all tracks), backing vocals (2, 4, 5, 7, 8)
 Ben Johnston – drums, percussion (all tracks); programming (2–10), backing vocals (6–9, 11)

Production 
 Adam Noble – production, mixing, engineer, programming

Charts

Notes

References 

2021 albums
Biffy Clyro albums
Warner Records albums